Lillian Tindyebwa is a Ugandan writer living in Kampala. She is the author of numerous books, notably the novel Recipe for Disaster, published in 1994 as part of the Fountain youth series. She is a founding member of FEMRITE, and the founder of Uganda Faith Writers Association.

Early life and education

Lillian Tindyebwa has said: "I was influenced through reading, and I grew up reading many books at home. My late father was a teacher of English and, although he never wrote, he read a lot. When I was in primary school, I particularly remember coming across an old copy of Bunyan's Pilgrims Progress among his things and reading it. I had often thought that I could be a writer, especially during my secondary school. For some unknown reason, possibly due to lack of role models, I did not get around to putting pen on paper until much later in my life."

She holds an MA in Literature from Makerere University, Kampala, Uganda.

Writing career

Tindyebwa's novel Recipe for Disaster (1994), published by Fountain Publishers, is used as a reader in secondary schools in Uganda. It is part of the Fountain youth series. She has written three children stories: A Day to Remember (2008), A Will to Win (2008) and Maggie’s Friends (2008). They are all published by Macmillan Publishers. Her short story "Looking for my Mother" is published in a FEMRITE anthology, A Woman’s Voice. Other short stories in FEMRITE anthologies are: "Hard Truth" in Words from a Granary, "Endless Distance" in World of their Own, "Just a Note" and "Gift of a Letter", included in Talking Tales. True life stories of women, also published in FEMRITE anthologies are "Betrayed by Fate", "Beyond the Dance and the Music", which are about FGM in Kapchorwa, Eastern Uganda, and "Dance with a Wolf" in I Dare to Say. She facilitated a writing workshop at Littworld 2012, in Nairobi.

Other activities
From 2009 she was a member of the jury committee of the Burt Award for African Literature for Children's Book Project for Tanzania, sponsored by CODE Canada. She also assisted in training the participating writers in creative writing skills. She is the Director of Uganda Faith Writers Association, an organisation that trains and develops Christian writing and publishing.

She works as a lecturer in Literature and Linguistics at Kabale University in South-Western Uganda.

She is married to Stephen and they have five children. She lives in Kampala, Uganda.

Published works

Novels

Children's books

A Time to Remember, Macmillan Publishers, 2008.
Maggie's Friends, Macmillan Publishers, 2008.
A Will to Win, Macmillan Publishers, 2008.

Short stories

"Endless Distance", in 
 "Beyond the Music and the Dance", in 
"Life Goes On", and "The Second family", in 
 "The Hard Truth", in 
"One Day in the Classroom", in 
"Mocked by Fate", in 
"Just a Note", in 
 "Hard Truth", in 
 "Looking for My Mother", in 
"Wind under my sails"

Poems
 Peace, in 
"God is here"

References

External links 
John Musinguzi, "Women writers want their own publishing house", The Observer (Uganda), 5 July 2010.
"Ugandan authors coming up but questions on quality remain", The Independent (Uganda), 29 September 2009.
Dennis D. Muhumuza, "At 'sweet 16', Femrite waves Uganda’s literature flag high", Sunday Monitor, 20 May 2012.
 Sophie Alal, "A short history of women’s writing in Uganda", The Stray Bullet, 27 November 2009.
"Redeeming the Night: War-traumatized youth find healing at writing camp"
"Purpose Driven Publishing in Uganda, an Interview with Author Lillian Tindyebwa"

Living people
Ugandan women writers
Makerere University alumni
Ugandan novelists
Ugandan women novelists
Ugandan women short story writers
Ugandan short story writers
Year of birth missing (living people)
21st-century Ugandan women writers